Epiphyas euphara is a species of moth of the family Tortricidae. It is found in Australia, where it has been recorded from Queensland and New South Wales.

The wingspan is about 21 mm.

References

Moths described in 1945
Epiphyas